Bryan Mélisse (born 25 March 1989) is a French professional footballer who plays for FC Swift Hesperange of the Luxembourg Division of Honour.

He received media attention during a UEFA Champions League qualifier game for making a horrible tackle.

Career
On 20 June 2019, Mélisse joined FC Swift Hesperange.

References

External links

1989 births
Living people
French footballers
Association football fullbacks
Louhans-Cuiseaux FC players
Challenger Pro League players
3. Liga players
Luxembourg National Division players
RFC Liège players
F91 Dudelange players
SV Elversberg players
Jeunesse Esch players
FC Swift Hesperange players
French expatriate footballers
French expatriate sportspeople in Germany
Expatriate footballers in Germany
French expatriate sportspeople in Luxembourg
Expatriate footballers in Luxembourg